Wilhelm Reinhard (18 March 1869 in Forsthaus Lutau, Kreis Flatow – 18 January 1955 in Dortmund) was an officer of the Schutzstaffel during World War II.  He held SS number 274,104 and was an SS-Obergruppenführer with date of rank from 31 December 1941.

Awards and decorations

1914 Iron Cross 2nd class, 14.09.1914
1914 Iron Cross 1st class, 24.12.1914
Pour le Mérite, 27.08.1917

See also
List SS-Obergruppenführer

References

External links
 

1869 births
1955 deaths
People from Złotów County
People from West Prussia
SS-Obergruppenführer
Members of the Reichstag of Nazi Germany
Sturmabteilung personnel
Recipients of the Pour le Mérite (military class)
Recipients of the Order of the Sacred Treasure
20th-century Freikorps personnel
German Army officers of World War II
Generals of Infantry (Wehrmacht)
Prussian Army personnel
German Army personnel of World War I